Coșna is a commune located in Suceava County, Bukovina, northeastern Romania. It is composed of five villages, namely: Coșna, Podu Coșnei, Românești, Teșna, and Valea Bancului. These were part of Dorna Candrenilor commune until 2003, when they were split off.

Gallery

References 

Communes in Suceava County
Localities in Southern Bukovina